Whitney Lake is a lake located west of Sled Harbor, New York. Fish species present in the lake are brook trout, and black bullhead. There is trail access on the east shore from Cedar Lake. No motors are allowed on this lake.

References

Lakes of New York (state)